Staffan Oscarsson (born 13 November 1951) is a Swedish sports shooter. He competed in the mixed 50 metre free pistol event at the 1980 Summer Olympics.

References

External links
 

1951 births
Living people
Swedish male sport shooters
Olympic shooters of Sweden
Shooters at the 1980 Summer Olympics
People from Strömsund Municipality
Sportspeople from Jämtland County